Wakefield is a historic mansion in Holly Springs, Mississippi, USA.

Location
The house is located in Holly Springs, a small town in Marshall County, Northern Mississippi.

History
The two-storey mansion was built with red bricks and completed in 1858. It was designed in the Greek Revival architectural style, with four Corinthian columns. It was built for Joel E. Wynne, a "prominent merchant and contractor." By 1890, the owner lost the house in a poker game.

The mansion was used as the main setting in Like Unto Like, a novel by Southern author Sherwood Bonner.

Architectural significance
As a contributing property to the East Holly Springs Historic District, it has been listed on the National Register of Historic Places since April 20, 1983.

References

External links

Houses completed in 1858
Antebellum architecture
Greek Revival houses in Mississippi
Buildings and structures in Holly Springs, Mississippi
Houses on the National Register of Historic Places in Mississippi
National Register of Historic Places in Marshall County, Mississippi
Historic district contributing properties in Mississippi